Královec is a municipality and village in Trutnov District in the Hradec Králové Region of the Czech Republic. It has about 200 inhabitants.

Geography

The municipality borders Poland to the north and east. It lies in the Broumov Highlands.

History
The first written mention of the village of Královec is from 1292, however, the woods in the area under the name Königshein were mentioned already in 1007. During its existence, the village was alternately part of the Žacléř estate, or it was owned by the town of Trutnov or by the Krzeszów Abbey.

Economy
There is a quarry in the municipal territory where solid volcanic rocks are mined.

Transport
There is the railway border crossing and road border crossing Královec / Lubawka to Poland.

Sights
The landmark of Královec is the Church of Saint John of Nepomuk. It was built in 1924–1928.

Notable people
Mathias Czwiczek (1601–1654), painter

Gallery

References

External links

Villages in Trutnov District